Trachyglanis intermedius is a species of loach catfish endemic to the Democratic Republic of the Congo where it is found in the Lulua River.  It grows to a length of 9.0 cm.

References 
 

Amphiliidae
Endemic fauna of the Democratic Republic of the Congo
Fish described in 1928
Taxa named by Jacques Pellegrin